2010 Omiya Ardija season

Competitions

Player statistics

Other pages
 J. League official site

Omiya Ardija
Omiya Ardija seasons